Apodolirion is a genus of herbaceous, perennial and bulbous plants in the Amaryllis family (Amaryllidaceae, subfamily Amaryllidoideae). It consists of 6 species distributed in South Africa. The name Apodolirion comes from the Greek and means "stemless flower" and describes the almost sessile flowers of these species.

Species 
The list of Apodolirion  species, with their complete scientific name, authority, and geographic distribution is given below.

Apodolirion amyanum D. Muller-Doblies
Apodolirion bolusii Baker
Apodolirion buchananii Baker
Apodolirion cedarbergense D. Muller-Doblies
Apodolirion lanceolatum (L.f.) Benth.
Apodolirion macowanii Baker

Uses 
A. buchananii (known as "Natal Crocus") is cultivated as an ornamental plant. It is a small plant with solitary flowers, that bloom in spring.

Bibliography 

 Müller-Doblies, D. 1986. De Liliifloris notulae 3. Enumeratio specierum generum Gethyllis et Apodolirion (Amaryllidaceae). Willdenowia. 15: 465-471.
 Germishuizen, G. Fabian, A. 1997. Wild flowers of Northern South Africa. Fernwood Press, Vlaeberg.
 Pooley, E. 1998. A Field Guide to Wild Flowers KwaZulu-Natal and the Eastern Region. Natal Flora Publications Trust, Durban.

References

External links 

Amaryllidoideae
Amaryllidaceae genera
Taxa named by John Gilbert Baker